Tindfjallajökull is a stratovolcano in the south of Iceland. It has erupted rocks of basaltic to rhyolitic composition, and a 5-km-wide caldera was formed during the eruption of the 54,000-year-old Thórsmörk Ignimbrite.
It is capped by a glacier of 19 km².  Its highest peak is Ýmir  (1462m), which takes its name from the giant Ýmir of Norse mythology.  The most recent eruption was at an unknown time in the Holocene.

The name means "Tindfjöll glacier". Tindfjöll ("peak mountains") is a ridge that extends to the south of the glacier.

The rivers that flow from the glacier are Hvítmaga  to the north-east, Gilsá  to the south, Þórólfsá  to the south-west, Valá  to the north-west and Blesá  to the north. Hvítmaga, Gilsá and Þórólfsá drain into Markarfljót while Valá and Blesá drain into Eystri Rangá .

See also
 List of volcanoes in Iceland
 Glaciers of Iceland
 Volcanism of Iceland

References

External links
 Tindfjallajökull in the Catalogue of Icelandic Volcanoes
 Map of the area

Stratovolcanoes of Iceland
Southern Region (Iceland)
East Volcanic Zone of Iceland
Glaciers of Iceland
Subglacial volcanoes of Iceland
Calderas of Iceland
Central volcanoes of Iceland
Pleistocene stratovolcanoes
Pleistocene calderas
Ymir